Meritage Homes Corporation is a publicly traded American real estate development company that constructs a variety of single-family detached homes across the United States.  It is the sixth largest home builder in the United States, based on 2020 home sales, and its homes are designed for entry-level and move-up buyers. The company also develops active adult communities and luxury real estate in Arizona.

The company is headquartered in Scottsdale, Arizona.

History
Meritage Homes was founded in 1985 as Monterey Homes in Scottsdale, Arizona, by Steve Hilton and William "Bill" Cleverly.

In 1997, the company changed its name to Meritage Homes Corp, and began trading on the New York Stock Exchange under the symbol MTH.

In 2011, the company unveiled its first net-zero energy homes, in Buckeye, Arizona.

In July 2014, the company acquired Douglasville, Georgia-based Legendary Communities, the owner operator of almost 4,000 home sites, for nearly $130 million.

In 2015, the company promoted its Sierra Crest development in Fontana, CA as California's first net-zero energy community.

In April 2019, the company built its first all-electric, zero-net-energy townhome community, in Irvine California. In December, the Wall Street Journal reported how large home builders like Meritage were targeting millennials by producing a larger number of less expensive, entry-level homes.

Operations
Meritage is headquartered in Scottsdale, Arizona, and divides its operations into four regions: West, Central, East and South. It develops homes for entry level and first move-up buyers, including "net zero" energy efficient homes that provide as much power as they consume. The company trades on the NY Stock Exchange under the symbol MTH, and is also listed in the S&P SmallCap 600 Index.

Awards and recognition
In 2021, the company was listed as one of Forbes' best mid-sized companies, ranking #39 on the list.

References

External links

 

Companies listed on the New York Stock Exchange
Home builders
Construction and civil engineering companies of the United States
Companies based in Scottsdale, Arizona